Lyndon Baines Johnson (August 27, 1908January 22, 1973), often referred to by his initials LBJ, was an American politician who served as the 36th president of the United States from 1963 to 1969. He had previously served as the 37th vice president from 1961 to 1963 under President John F. Kennedy, and was sworn in shortly after Kennedy's assassination. A Democrat from Texas, Johnson also served as a U.S. representative, U.S. senator and the Senate's majority leader. He holds the distinction of being one of the few presidents who served in all elected offices at the federal level.

Born in a farmhouse in Stonewall, Texas, to a local political family, Johnson worked as a high school teacher and a congressional aide before winning election to the U.S. House of Representatives in 1937. He won election to the United States Senate in 1948 after a narrow and controversial victory in the Democratic Party's primary. He was appointed to the position of Senate Majority Whip in 1951. He became the Senate Democratic leader in 1953 and majority leader in 1954. In 1960 Johnson ran for the Democratic nomination for president. Ultimately, Senator Kennedy bested Johnson and his other rivals for the nomination, then surprised many by offering to make Johnson his vice presidential running mate.  The Kennedy-Johnson ticket won in the 1960 presidential election. Vice President Johnson assumed the presidency on November 22, 1963, after President Kennedy was assassinated. The following year Johnson was elected to the presidency when he won in a landslide against Arizona Senator Barry Goldwater, receiving 61.1% of the popular vote in the 1964 presidential election, the largest share won by any presidential candidate since the 1820 election.

Johnson's domestic policy was aimed at expanding civil rights, public broadcasting, access to healthcare, aid to education and the arts, urban and rural development, and public services. In 1964 Johnson coined the term the "Great Society"  to describe these efforts. In addition, he sought to create better living conditions for low-income Americans by spearheading a campaign unofficially called the "War on Poverty". As part of these efforts, Johnson signed the Social Security Amendments of 1965, which resulted in the creation of Medicare and Medicaid. Johnson followed his predecessor's actions in bolstering NASA and made the Apollo Program a national priority. He enacted the Higher Education Act of 1965 which established federally insured student loans. Johnson signed the Immigration and Nationality Act of 1965 which laid the groundwork for U.S. immigration policy today. Johnson's opinion on the issue of civil rights put him at odds with other white, southern Democrats. His civil rights legacy was shaped by signing the Civil Rights Act of 1964, the Voting Rights Act of 1965, and the Civil Rights Act of 1968. During his presidency, the American political landscape transformed significantly, as white southerners who were once staunch Democrats began moving to the Republican Party and black voters began moving to the Democratic Party. Because of his domestic agenda, Johnson's presidency marked the peak of modern liberalism in the United States.

Johnson's presidency took place during the Cold War and his foreign policy prioritised containment of communism. Prior to his presidency, the U.S. was already involved in the Vietnam War, supporting South Vietnam against the communist North. Following a naval skirmish in 1964 between the United States and North Vietnam, Congress passed the Gulf of Tonkin Resolution, which granted Johnson the power to launch a full-scale military intervention in South East Asia. The number of American military personnel in Vietnam increased dramatically, and casualties soared among U.S. soldiers and Vietnamese civilians. Johnson also expanded military operations in neighboring Laos to destroy North Vietnamese supply lines. In 1968, the communist Tet Offensive inflamed the anti-war movement, especially among draft-age students on university campuses, and public opinion turned against America's involvement in the war. In Europe, Johnson's administration continued to promote and foster Western European political and economic cooperation and integration as his predecessors had.

At home, Johnson faced further troubles with race riots in major cities and increasing crime rates. His political opponents seized the opportunity and raised demands for "law and order" policies. Johnson began his presidency with near-universal support, but his approval declined throughout his presidency as the public became frustrated with both the Vietnam War and domestic unrest. Johnson initially sought to run for re-election; however, following disappointing results in the New Hampshire primary he withdrew his candidacy. The war was a major election issue and the 1968 presidential election saw Republican candidate Richard Nixon defeat Johnson's vice president Hubert Humphrey. At the end of his presidency in 1969, Johnson returned to his Texas ranch, published his memoirs, and in other respects kept a low profile until he died of a heart attack in 1973.

Johnson is one of the most controversial presidents in American history. During his term his performance deeply divided his party. Furthermore, public opinion and academic assessments of his legacy have fluctuated greatly ever since. Historians and scholars rank Johnson in the upper tier because of his accomplishments regarding domestic policy. His administration passed many major laws that made substantial changes in civil rights, health care, welfare, and education. Conversely, Johnson is strongly criticized for his foreign policy, namely escalating American involvement in the Vietnam War.

Early life

Lyndon Baines Johnson was born on August 27, 1908, near Stonewall, Texas, in a small farmhouse on the Pedernales River. He was the eldest of five children born to Samuel Ealy Johnson Jr. and Rebekah Baines. Johnson had one brother, Sam Houston Johnson, and three sisters, Rebekah, Josefa, and Lucia. The nearby small town of Johnson City, Texas, was named after LBJ's father's cousin, James Polk Johnson, whose forebears had moved west from Georgia. Johnson had English-Irish, German, and Ulster Scots ancestry. Through his mother, he was a great-grandson of pioneer Baptist clergyman George Washington Baines, who pastored eight churches in Texas, as well as others in Arkansas and Louisiana. Baines was also the president of Baylor University during the American Civil War.

Johnson's grandfather, Samuel Ealy Johnson Sr., was raised as a Baptist and for a time was a member of the Christian Church (Disciples of Christ). In his later years, the grandfather became a Christadelphian; Johnson's father also joined the Christadelphian Church toward the end of his life. Later, as a politician, Johnson was influenced in his positive attitude toward Jews by the religious beliefs that his family, especially his grandfather, had shared with him. Johnson's favorite Bible verse came from the King James Version of Isaiah 1:18 "Come now, and let us reason together..."

Johnson grew up in poverty, with his father losing a great deal of money. Biographer Robert Caro described him as being raised "in a land without electricity, where the soil was so rocky that it was hard to earn a living from it."

In school, Johnson was a talkative youth who was elected president of his 11th-grade class. He graduated in 1924 from Johnson City High School, where he participated in public speaking, debate, and baseball. At the age of 15, Johnson was the youngest member of his class. Pressured by his parents to attend college, he enrolled at a "sub college" of Southwest Texas State Teachers College (SWTSTC) in the summer of 1924, where students from unaccredited high schools could take the 12th-grade courses needed for admission to college. He left the school just weeks after his arrival and decided to move to southern California. He worked at his cousin's legal practice and in various odd jobs before returning to Texas, where he worked as a day laborer.

In 1926, Johnson managed to enroll at SWTSTC (now Texas State University). He worked his way through school, participated in debate and campus politics, and edited the school newspaper, The College Star. The college years refined his skills of persuasion and political organization. The job helped him to save money to complete his education, and he graduated in 1930 with a Bachelor of Science degree in history and his certificate of qualification as a high school teacher. He briefly taught at Pearsall High School before taking a position as teacher of public speaking at Sam Houston High School in Houston.

When he returned to San Marcos in 1965, after signing the Higher Education Act of 1965, Johnson reminisced:

Entry into politics

After Richard M. Kleberg won a 1931 special election to represent Texas in the United States House of Representatives, he appointed Johnson as his legislative secretary. This marked Johnson's formal introduction into politics. Johnson secured the position on the recommendation of his father and that of State Senator Welly Hopkins, for whom Johnson had campaigned in 1930. Kleberg had little interest in performing the day-to-day duties of a Congressman, instead delegating them to Johnson. After Franklin D. Roosevelt won the 1932 presidential election, Johnson became a lifelong supporter of Roosevelt's New Deal. Johnson was elected speaker of the "Little Congress", a group of Congressional aides, where he cultivated Congressmen, newspapermen, and lobbyists. Johnson's friends soon included aides to President Roosevelt as well as fellow Texans such as Vice President John Nance Garner and Congressman Sam Rayburn.

Johnson married Claudia Alta Taylor, also known as "Lady Bird", of Karnack, Texas, on November 17, 1934. He met her after he had attended Georgetown University Law Center for several months. Johnson later quit his Georgetown studies after the first semester in 1934. During their first date he asked her to marry him; many dates later, she finally agreed. The wedding was officiated by Arthur R. McKinstry at St. Mark's Episcopal Church in San Antonio. They had two daughters, Lynda Bird, born in 1944, and Luci Baines, born in 1947. Johnson gave his children names with the LBJ initials; his dog was Little Beagle Johnson. His home was the LBJ Ranch; his initials were on his cufflinks, ashtrays, and clothes. During his marriage, Lyndon Johnson had affairs with "numerous" women, in particular with Alice Marsh (née Glass) who assisted him politically.

In 1935, he was appointed head of the Texas National Youth Administration, which enabled him to use the government to create education and job opportunities for young people. He resigned two years later to run for Congress. Johnson, a notoriously tough boss throughout his career, often demanded long workdays and work on weekends. He was described by friends, fellow politicians, and historians as motivated by an exceptional lust for power and control. As Johnson's biographer Robert Caro observes, "Johnson's ambition was uncommonin the degree to which it was unencumbered by even the slightest excess weight of ideology, of philosophy, of principles, of beliefs."

U.S. House of Representatives (1937–1949)
In 1937, after the death of thirteen-term Congressman James P. Buchanan, Johnson successfully campaigned in a special election for Texas's 10th congressional district, that covered Austin and the surrounding hill country. He ran on a New Deal platform and was effectively aided by his wife. He served in the House from April 10, 1937, to January 3, 1949. President Franklin D. Roosevelt found Johnson to be a welcome ally and conduit for information, particularly about issues concerning internal politics in Texas and the machinations of Vice President John Nance Garner and Speaker of the House Sam Rayburn. Johnson was immediately appointed to the Naval Affairs Committee. He worked for rural electrification and other improvements for his district. Johnson steered the projects towards contractors he knew, such as Herman and George Brown, who would finance much of Johnson's future career. In 1941, he ran for the Democratic U.S. Senate nomination in a special election, losing narrowly to the sitting Governor of Texas, businessman and radio personality W. Lee O'Daniel. O'Daniel received 175,590 votes (30.49 percent) to Johnson's 174,279 (30.26 percent).

Active military duty (1941–1942)

Johnson was appointed a Lieutenant Commander in the U.S. Naval Reserve on June 21, 1940. While serving as a U.S. representative, he was called to active duty three days after the Japanese attack on Pearl Harbor in December 1941. His orders were to report to the Office of the Chief of Naval Operations in Washington, D.C., for instruction and training. Following his training, he asked Undersecretary of the Navy James Forrestal for a job in Washington. He was sent instead to inspect shipyard facilities in Texas and on the West Coast. In the spring of 1942, President Roosevelt decided he needed better information on conditions in the Southwest Pacific, and to send a highly trusted political ally to get it. From a suggestion by Forrestal, Roosevelt assigned Johnson to a three-man survey team covering the Southwest Pacific.

Johnson reported to General Douglas MacArthur in Australia. Johnson and two U.S. Army officers went to the 22nd Bomb Group base, which was assigned the high-risk mission of bombing the Japanese airbase at Lae in New Guinea. On June 9, 1942, Johnson volunteered as an observer for an airstrike on New Guinea by B-26 bombers. Reports vary on what happened to the aircraft carrying Johnson during that mission. Johnson's biographer Robert Caro accepts Johnson's account and supports it with testimony from the aircrew concerned: the aircraft was attacked, disabling one engine and it turned back before reaching its objective, though remaining under heavy fire. Others claim that it turned back because of generator trouble before reaching the objective and before encountering enemy aircraft and never came under fire; this is supported by official flight records. Other airplanes that continued to the target came under fire near the target about the same time Johnson's plane was recorded as having landed back at the original airbase. MacArthur recommended Johnson for the Silver Star for gallantry in action: the only member of the crew to receive a decoration. After it was approved by the Army, he presented the medal to Johnson, with the following citation:

Johnson, who had used a movie camera to record conditions, reported to Roosevelt, to Navy leaders, and Congress that conditions were deplorable and unacceptable: some historians have suggested this was in exchange for MacArthur's recommendation to award the Silver Star. He argued that the southwest Pacific urgently needed a higher priority and a larger share of war supplies. The warplanes sent there, for example, were "far inferior" to Japanese planes; and morale was bad. He told Forrestal that the Pacific Fleet had a "critical" need for 6,800 additional experienced men. Johnson prepared a twelve-point program to upgrade the effort in the region, stressing "greater cooperation and coordination within the various commands and between the different war theaters". Congress responded by making Johnson chairman of a high-powered subcommittee of the Naval Affairs Committee, with a mission similar to that of the Truman Committee in the Senate. He probed the peacetime "business as usual" inefficiencies that permeated the naval war and demanded that admirals shape up and get the job done. Johnson went too far when he proposed a bill that would crack down on the draft exemptions of shipyard workers if they were absent from work too often; organized labor blocked the bill and denounced him. Johnson's biographer Robert Dallek concludes, "The mission was a temporary exposure to danger calculated to satisfy Johnson's personal and political wishes, but it also represented a genuine effort on his part, however misplaced, to improve the lot of America's fighting men."

In addition to the Silver Star, Johnson received the American Campaign Medal, Asiatic-Pacific Campaign Medal, and the World War II Victory Medal. He was released from active duty on July 17, 1942, and remained in the Navy Reserve, later promoted to Commander on October 19, 1949 (effective June 2, 1948). He resigned from the Navy Reserve effective January 18, 1964.

U.S. Senate (1949–1961)

1948 U.S. Senate election

In the 1948 elections, Johnson again ran for the Senate and won in a highly controversial Democratic Party primary against the well-known former governor Coke Stevenson. Johnson drew crowds to fairgrounds with his rented helicopter, dubbed "The Johnson City Windmill". He raised money to flood the state with campaign circulars and won over conservatives by casting doubts on Stevenson's support for the Taft–Hartley Act (curbing union power). Stevenson came in first in the primary but lacked a majority, so a runoff election was held; Johnson campaigned harder, while Stevenson's efforts slumped due to a lack of funds.

US presidential historian Michael Beschloss observed that Johnson "gave white supremacist speeches" during the 1948 campaign, in order to secure the white vote. This cemented his reputation as a moderate in American politics, which would enable his ability to pivot and further civil rights causes upon assuming the presidency.

The runoff vote count, handled by the Democratic State Central Committee, took a week. Johnson was announced the winner by 87 votes out of 988,295, an extremely narrow margin of victory. However, Johnson's victory was based on 200 "patently fraudulent" ballots reported six days after the election from Box 13 in Jim Wells County, in an area dominated by political boss George Parr. The added names were in alphabetical order and written with the same pen and handwriting, following at the end of the list of voters. Some of the persons in this part of the list insisted that they had not voted that day. Election judge Luis Salas said in 1977 that he had certified 202 fraudulent ballots for Johnson. Robert Caro made the case in his 1990 book that Johnson had stolen the election in Jim Wells County, and that there were thousands of fraudulent votes in other counties as well, including 10,000 votes switched in San Antonio. The Democratic State Central Committee voted to certify Johnson's nomination by a majority of one (29–28), with the last vote cast on Johnson's behalf by the publisher Frank W. Mayborn of Temple, Texas. The state Democratic convention upheld Johnson. Stevenson went to court, eventually taking his case before the U.S. Supreme Court, but with timely help from his friend and future U.S. Supreme Court Justice Abe Fortas, Johnson prevailed on the basis that jurisdiction over naming a nominee rested with the party, not the federal government. Johnson soundly defeated Republican Jack Porter in the general election in November and went to Washington, permanently dubbed "Landslide Lyndon". Johnson, dismissive of his critics, happily adopted the nickname.

Freshman senator to majority whip

Once in the Senate, Johnson was known among his colleagues for his highly successful "courtships" of older senators, especially Senator Richard Russell, Democrat from Georgia, the leader of the Conservative coalition and arguably the most powerful man in the Senate. Johnson proceeded to gain Russell's favor in the same way he had "courted" Speaker Sam Rayburn and gained his crucial support in the House.

Johnson was appointed to the Senate Armed Services Committee, and in 1950 helped create the Preparedness Investigating Subcommittee. He became its chairman, and conducted investigations of defense costs and efficiency. These investigations revealed old investigations and demanded actions that were already being taken in part by the Truman administration, although it can be said that the committee's investigations reinforced the need for changes. Johnson gained headlines and national attention through his handling of the press, the efficiency with which his committee issued new reports, and the fact that he ensured that every report was endorsed unanimously by the committee. He used his political influence in the Senate to receive broadcast licenses from the Federal Communications Commission in his wife's name. After the 1950 general elections, Johnson was chosen as Senate Majority Whip in 1951 under the new Majority Leader, Ernest McFarland of Arizona, and served from 1951 to 1953.

Senate Democratic leader

In the 1952 general election, Republicans won a majority in both the House and Senate. Among defeated Democrats that year was McFarland, who lost to upstart Barry Goldwater. In January 1953, Johnson was chosen by his fellow Democrats to be Minority Leader; he became the most junior senator ever elected to this position. One of his first actions was to eliminate the seniority system in making appointments to committees while retaining it for chairmanships. In the 1954 election, Johnson was re-elected to the Senate and, since the Democrats won the majority in the Senate, then became majority leader. Former Majority Leader William Knowland of California became the Minority Leader. Johnson's duties were to schedule legislation and help pass measures favored by the Democrats. Johnson, Rayburn and President Dwight D. Eisenhower worked well together in passing Eisenhower's domestic and foreign agenda.

During the Suez Crisis, Johnson tried to prevent the U.S. government from criticizing the Israeli invasion of the Sinai peninsula. Along with the rest of the nation, Johnson was appalled by the threat of possible Soviet domination of space flight implied by the launch of the first artificial Earth satellite Sputnik 1 and used his influence to ensure passage of the 1958 National Aeronautics and Space Act, which established the civilian space agency NASA.

Historians Caro and Dallek consider Lyndon Johnson the most effective Senate majority leader in history. He was unusually proficient at gathering information. One biographer suggests he was "the greatest intelligence gatherer Washington has ever known", discovering exactly where every senator stood on issues, his philosophy and prejudices, his strengths and weaknesses and what it took to get his vote. Robert Baker claimed that Johnson would occasionally send senators on NATO trips to avoid their dissenting votes. Central to Johnson's control was "The Treatment", described by two journalists:

In 1955, Johnson persuaded Oregon's Independent Wayne Morse to join the Democratic caucus.

A 60-cigarette-per-day smoker, Johnson suffered a near-fatal heart attack on July 2, 1955, at age 46. He abruptly gave up smoking as a result and, with only a couple of exceptions, did not resume the habit until after he left the White House on January 20, 1969. Johnson announced he would remain as his party's leader in the Senate on New Year's Eve 1955, his doctors reporting he had made "a most satisfactory recovery" since his heart attack five months before.

Campaigns of 1960

Johnson's success in the Senate rendered him a potential Democratic presidential candidate; he had been the "favorite son" candidate of the Texas delegation at the Party's national convention in 1956, and appeared to be in a strong position to run for the 1960 nomination. Jim Rowe repeatedly urged Johnson to launch a campaign in early 1959, but Johnson thought it better to wait, thinking that John Kennedy's efforts would create a division in the ranks which could then be exploited. Rowe finally joined the Humphrey campaign in frustration, another move that Johnson thought played into his own strategy.

Candidacy for president
Johnson made a late entry into the campaign in July 1960 which, coupled with a reluctance to leave Washington, allowed the rival Kennedy campaign to secure a substantial early advantage among Democratic state party officials. Johnson underestimated Kennedy's endearing qualities of charm and intelligence, as compared to his reputation as the more crude and wheeling-dealing "Landslide Lyndon". Caro suggests that Johnson's hesitancy was the result of an overwhelming fear of failure.

Johnson attempted in vain to capitalize on Kennedy's youth, poor health, and failure to take a position regarding Joseph McCarthy and McCarthyism. He had formed a "Stop Kennedy" coalition with Adlai Stevenson, Stuart Symington, and Hubert Humphrey, but it proved a failure. Despite Johnson having the support of established Democrats and the party leadership, this did not translate into popular approval.  Johnson received 409 votes on the only ballot at the Democratic convention to Kennedy's 806, and so the convention nominated Kennedy. Tip O'Neill was a representative from Kennedy's home state of Massachusetts at that time, and he recalled that Johnson approached him at the convention and said, "Tip, I know you have to support Kennedy at the start, but I'd like to have you with me on the second ballot." O'Neill replied, "Senator, there's not going to be any second ballot."

Vice-presidential nomination
According to Kennedy's Special Counsel Myer Feldman and Kennedy himself, it is impossible to reconstruct the precise manner in which Johnson's vice-presidential nomination ultimately took place. Kennedy did realize that he could not be elected without the support of traditional Southern Democrats, most of whom had backed Johnson; nevertheless, labor leaders were unanimous in their opposition to Johnson. AFL-CIO President George Meany called Johnson "the arch-foe of labor", while Illinois AFL-CIO President Reuben Soderstrom asserted Kennedy had "made chumps out of leaders of the American labor movement". After much back and forth with party leaders and others on the matter, Kennedy did offer Johnson the vice-presidential nomination at the Los Angeles Biltmore Hotel at 10:15 am on July 14, the morning after he was nominated, and Johnson accepted. From that point to the actual nomination that evening, the facts are in dispute in many respects. (Convention chairman LeRoy Collins' declaration of a two-thirds majority in favor by voice vote is even disputed.)

Seymour Hersh stated that Robert F. Kennedy (known as Bobby) hated Johnson for his attacks on the Kennedy family, and later maintained that his brother offered the position to Johnson merely as a courtesy, expecting him to decline. Arthur M. Schlesinger Jr. concurred with Robert Kennedy's version of events, and put forth that John Kennedy would have preferred Stuart Symington as his running-mate, alleging that Johnson teamed with House Speaker Sam Rayburn and pressured Kennedy to favor Johnson. Robert Kennedy wanted his brother to choose labor leader Walter Reuther.

Biographer Robert Caro offered a different perspective; he wrote that the Kennedy campaign was desperate to win what was forecast to be a very close election against Richard Nixon and Henry Cabot Lodge Jr. Johnson was needed on the ticket to help carry Texas and the Southern states. Caro's research showed that on July 14, John Kennedy started the process while Johnson was still asleep. At 6:30 am, John Kennedy asked Robert Kennedy to prepare an estimate of upcoming electoral votes "including Texas". Robert called Pierre Salinger and Kenneth O'Donnell to assist him. Salinger realized the ramifications of counting Texas votes as their own and asked him whether he was considering a Kennedy–Johnson ticket, and Robert replied "yes". Caro contends that it was then that John Kennedy called Johnson to arrange a meeting; he also called Pennsylvania governor David L. Lawrence, a Johnson backer, to request that he nominate Johnson for vice president if Johnson were to accept the role. According to Caro, Kennedy and Johnson met and Johnson said that Kennedy would have trouble with Kennedy supporters who were anti-Johnson. Kennedy returned to his suite to announce the Kennedy–Johnson ticket to his closest supporters, including northern political bosses. O'Donnell was angry at what he considered a betrayal by Kennedy, who had previously cast Johnson as anti-labor and anti-liberal. Afterward, Robert Kennedy visited labor leaders who were extremely unhappy with the choice of Johnson and, after seeing the depth of labor opposition to Johnson, Robert ran messages between the hotel suites of his brother and Johnson—apparently trying to undermine the proposed ticket without John Kennedy's authorization.

Caro continues in his analysis that Robert Kennedy tried to get Johnson to agree to be the Democratic Party chairman rather than the vice president. Johnson refused to accept a change in plans unless it came directly from John Kennedy. Despite his brother's interference, John Kennedy was firm that Johnson was who he wanted as running mate; he met with staffers such as Larry O'Brien, his national campaign manager, to say that Johnson was to be vice president. O'Brien recalled later that John Kennedy's words were wholly unexpected, but that after a brief consideration of the electoral vote situation, he thought "it was a stroke of genius". When John and Robert Kennedy next saw their father Joe Kennedy, he told them that signing Johnson as running mate was the smartest thing they had ever done.

Another account of how Johnson's nomination came about was told by Evelyn Lincoln, JFK's secretary (both before and during his presidency).  In 1993, in a videotaped interview, she described how the decision was made, stating she was the only witness to a private meeting between John and Robert Kennedy in a suite at the Biltmore Hotel where they made the decision. She said she went in and out of the room as they spoke and, while she was in the room, heard them say that Johnson had tried to blackmail JFK into offering him the vice-presidential nomination with evidence of his womanizing provided by FBI director J. Edgar Hoover. She also overheard them discuss possible ways to avoid making the offer, and ultimately conclude that JFK had no choice.

Re-election to U.S. Senate
At the same time as his vice presidential run, Johnson also sought a third term in the U.S. Senate. According to Robert Caro, "On November 8, 1960, Lyndon Johnson won an election for both the vice presidency of the United States, on the Kennedy–Johnson ticket, and for a third term as senator (he had Texas law changed to allow him to run for both offices). When he won the vice presidency, he made arrangements to resign from the Senate, as he was required to do under federal law, as soon as it convened on January 3, 1961." In 1988, Lloyd Bentsen, the vice presidential running mate of Democratic presidential candidate Michael Dukakis, and a senator from Texas, took advantage of "Lyndon's law", and was able to retain his seat in the Senate despite Dukakis's loss to George H. W. Bush.

Johnson was re-elected senator with 1,306,605 votes (58 percent) to Republican John Tower's 927,653 (41.1 percent). Fellow Democrat William A. Blakley was appointed to replace Johnson as senator, but Blakley lost a special election in May 1961 to Tower.

Vice presidency (1961–1963)

After the election, Johnson was quite concerned about the traditionally ineffective nature of his new office and set about to assume authority not allotted to the position. He initially sought a transfer of the authority of Senate majority leader to the vice presidency, since that office made him president of the Senate, but faced vehement opposition from the Democratic Caucus, including members whom he had counted as his supporters.

Johnson sought to increase his influence within the executive branch. He drafted an executive order for Kennedy's signature, granting Johnson "general supervision" over matters of national security, and requiring all government agencies to "cooperate fully with the vice president in the carrying out of these assignments". Kennedy's response was to sign a non-binding letter requesting Johnson to "review" national security policies instead. Kennedy similarly turned down early requests from Johnson to be given an office adjacent to the Oval Office and to employ a full-time Vice Presidential staff within the White House. His lack of influence was thrown into relief later in 1961 when Kennedy appointed Johnson's friend Sarah T. Hughes to a federal judgeship, whereas Johnson had tried and failed to garner the nomination for Hughes at the beginning of his vice presidency. House Speaker Sam Rayburn wrangled the appointment from Kennedy in exchange for support of an administration bill.

Moreover, many members of the Kennedy White House were contemptuous of Johnson, including the president's brother, Attorney General Robert F. Kennedy, and they ridiculed his comparatively brusque, crude manner. Congressman Tip O'Neill recalled that the Kennedy men "had a disdain for Johnson that they didn't even try to hide.... They actually took pride in snubbing him."

Kennedy, however, made efforts to keep Johnson busy, informed, and at the White House often, telling aides, "I can't afford to have my vice president, who knows every reporter in Washington, going around saying we're all screwed up, so we're going to keep him happy." Kennedy appointed him to jobs such as the head of the President's Committee on Equal Employment Opportunities, through which he worked with African Americans and other minorities. Kennedy may have intended this to remain a more nominal position, but Taylor Branch contends in Pillar of Fire that Johnson pushed the Kennedy administration's actions further and faster for civil rights than Kennedy originally intended to go. Branch notes the irony of Johnson being the advocate for civil rights when the Kennedy family had hoped that he would appeal to conservative southern voters. In particular, he notes Johnson's Memorial Day 1963 speech at Gettysburg, Pennsylvania, as being a catalyst that led to more action.

Johnson took on numerous minor diplomatic missions, which gave him some insights into global issues, as well as opportunities for self-promotion in the name of showing the country's flag. During his visit to West Berlin on August 19–20, 1961, Johnson calmed Berliners who were outraged by the building of the Berlin Wall. He also attended Cabinet and National Security Council meetings. Kennedy gave Johnson control over all presidential appointments involving Texas, and appointed him chairman of the President's Ad Hoc Committee for Science.

Kennedy also appointed Johnson Chairman of the National Aeronautics and Space Council. The Soviets beat the United States with the first manned spaceflight in April 1961, and Kennedy gave Johnson the task of evaluating the state of the U.S. space program and recommending a project that would allow the United States to catch up or beat the Soviets. Johnson responded with a recommendation that the United States gain the leadership role by committing the resources to embark on a project to land an American on the Moon in the 1960s. Kennedy assigned priority to the space program, but Johnson's appointment provided potential cover in case of a failure.

Johnson was touched by a Senate scandal in August 1963 when Bobby Baker, the Secretary to the Majority Leader of the Senate and a protégé of Johnson's, came under investigation by the Senate Rules Committee for allegations of bribery and financial malfeasance. One witness alleged that Baker had arranged for the witness to give kickbacks for the Vice President. Baker resigned in October, and the investigation did not expand to Johnson. The negative publicity from the affair fed rumors in Washington circles that Kennedy was planning on dropping Johnson from the Democratic ticket in the upcoming 1964 presidential election. However, on October 31, 1963, a reporter asked if he intended and expected to have Johnson on the ticket the following year. Kennedy replied, "Yes to both those questions." There is little doubt that Robert Kennedy and Johnson hated each other, yet John and Robert Kennedy agreed that dropping Johnson from the ticket could produce heavy losses in the South in the 1964 election, and they agreed that Johnson would stay on the ticket.

Presidency (1963–1969)

Johnson assumed the presidency amid a healthy economy with steady growth and low unemployment, and with no serious international crises. Therefore, he focused his attention on domestic policy, until escalation of the Vietnam War began in August 1964.

Succession

Johnson was quickly sworn in as president on Air Force One in Dallas on November 22, 1963, just two hours and eight minutes after John F. Kennedy was assassinated, amid suspicions of a conspiracy against the government. He was sworn in by U.S. District Judge Sarah T. Hughes, a family friend. In the rush, Johnson took the oath of office using a Roman Catholic missal from President Kennedy's desk, despite not being Catholic, due to the missal being mistaken for a Bible. Cecil Stoughton's iconic photograph of Johnson taking the presidential oath of office as Mrs. Kennedy looks on is the most famous photo ever taken aboard a presidential aircraft.

Johnson was convinced of the need to make an impression of an immediate transition of power after the assassination to provide stability to a grieving nation in shock. He and the Secret Service were concerned that he could also be a target of a conspiracy, and felt compelled to rapidly remove the new president from Dallas and return him to Washington. This was greeted by some with assertions that Johnson was in too much haste to assume power.

On November 27, 1963, the new president delivered his Let Us Continue speech to a joint session of Congress, saying that "No memorial oration or eulogy could more eloquently honor President Kennedy's memory than the earliest possible passage of the Civil Rights Bill for which he fought so long." The wave of national grief following the assassination gave enormous momentum to Johnson's promise to carry out Kennedy's plans and his policy of seizing Kennedy's legacy to give momentum to his legislative agenda.

On November 29, 1963, just one week after Kennedy's assassination, Johnson issued an executive order to rename NASA's Apollo Launch Operations Center and the NASA/Air Force Cape Canaveral launch facilities as the John F. Kennedy Space Center. Cape Canaveral was officially known as Cape Kennedy from 1963 until 1973.

Also on November 29, Johnson established a panel headed by Chief Justice Earl Warren, known as the Warren Commission, through executive order to investigate Kennedy's assassination and surrounding conspiracies. The commission conducted extensive research and hearings and unanimously concluded that Lee Harvey Oswald acted alone in the assassination. However, the report remains controversial among some conspiracy theorists.

Johnson retained senior Kennedy appointees, some for the full term of his presidency. He even retained Attorney General Robert Kennedy, with whom he had a notoriously difficult relationship. Robert Kennedy remained in office for a few months until leaving in 1964 to run for the Senate. Although Johnson had no official chief of staff, Walter Jenkins was the first among a handful of equals and presided over the details of daily operations at the White House. George Reedy, who was Johnson's second-longest-serving aide, assumed the post of press secretary when John F. Kennedy's own Pierre Salinger left that post in March 1964. Horace Busby was another "triple-threat man", as Johnson referred to his aides. He served primarily as a speechwriter and political analyst. Bill Moyers was the youngest member of Johnson's staff; he handled scheduling and speechwriting part-time.

Legislative initiatives
The new president thought it advantageous to quickly pursue one of Kennedy's primary legislative goals—a tax cut. Johnson worked closely with Harry F. Byrd of Virginia to negotiate a reduction in the budget below $100 billion in exchange for what became overwhelming Senate approval of the Revenue Act of 1964. Congressional approval followed at the end of February, and facilitated efforts to follow on civil rights. In late 1963, Johnson also launched the initial offensive of his War on Poverty, recruiting Kennedy relative Sargent Shriver, then head of the Peace Corps, to spearhead the effort. In March 1964, LBJ sent to Congress the Economic Opportunity Act, which created the Job Corps and the Community Action Program, designed to attack poverty locally. The act also created VISTA, Volunteers in Service to America, a domestic counterpart to the Peace Corps.

Civil Rights Act of 1964

President Kennedy had submitted a civil rights bill to Congress in June 1963, which was met with strong opposition. Johnson renewed the effort and asked Bobby Kennedy to spearhead the undertaking for the administration on Capitol Hill. This provided adequate political cover for Johnson should the effort fail; but if it were successful, Johnson would receive ample credit. Historian Robert Caro notes that the bill Kennedy had submitted was facing the same tactics that prevented the passage of civil rights bills in the past: southern congressmen and senators used congressional procedure to prevent it from coming to a vote. In particular, they held up all of the major bills Kennedy had proposed and that were considered urgent, especially the tax reform bill, to force the bill's supporters to pull it.

Johnson was quite familiar with the procedural tactic, as he played a role in a similar tactic against a civil rights bill that Harry Truman had submitted to Congress fifteen years earlier. In that fight, a rent-control renewal bill was held up until the civil rights bill was withdrawn. Believing that the current course meant that the Civil Rights Act would suffer the same fate, he adopted a different strategy from that of Kennedy, who had mostly removed himself from the legislative process. By tackling the tax cut first, the previous tactic was eliminated.

Passing the civil rights bill in the House required getting it through the Rules Committee, which had been holding it up in an attempt to kill it. Johnson decided on a campaign to use a discharge petition to force it onto the House floor. Facing a growing threat that they would be bypassed, the House rules committee approved the bill and moved it to the floor of the full House, which passed it shortly thereafter by a vote of 290–110. In the Senate, since the tax bill had passed three days earlier, the anti-civil rights senators were left with the filibuster as their only remaining tool. Overcoming the filibuster required the support of over twenty Republicans, who were growing less supportive because their party was about to nominate for president a candidate who opposed the bill. According to Caro, Johnson ultimately could convince Republican leader Everett Dirksen to support the bill that amassed the necessary Republican votes to overcome the filibuster in March 1964; after 75 hours of debate, the bill passed the Senate by a vote of 71–29. Johnson signed the fortified Civil Rights Act of 1964 into law on July 2. The evening after signing the bill, Johnson told aide Bill Moyers, "I think we may have lost the south for your lifetime – and mine", anticipating a coming backlash from Southern whites against Johnson's Democratic Party.

Biographer Randall B. Woods has argued that Johnson effectively used appeals to Judeo-Christian ethics to garner support for the civil rights law. Woods writes that Johnson undermined the Southern filibuster against the bill:

Woods states that Johnson's religiosity ran deep: "At 15 he joined the Disciples of Christ, or Christian, church and would forever believe that it was the duty of the rich to care for the poor, the strong to assist the weak, and the educated to speak for the inarticulate." Johnson shared the beliefs of his mentor, FDR, in that he paired liberal values to religious values, believing that freedom and social justice served both God and man.

The Great Society

Johnson wanted a catchy slogan for the 1964 campaign to describe his proposed domestic agenda for 1965. Eric Goldman, who joined the White House in December of that year, thought Johnson's domestic program was best captured in the title of Walter Lippman's book, The Good Society. Richard Goodwin tweaked it to "The Great Society" and incorporated this in detail as part of a speech for Johnson in May 1964 at the University of Michigan. It encompassed movements of urban renewal, modern transportation, clean environment, anti-poverty, healthcare reform, crime control, and educational reform.

1964 presidential election

In Spring 1964, Johnson did not look optimistically upon the prospect of being elected president in his own right. A pivotal change took place in April when he assumed personal management of negotiations between the railroad brotherhood and the railroad industry over the issue of featherbedding. Johnson emphasized to the parties the potential impact upon the economy of a strike. After considerable horse-trading, especially with the carriers who won promises from the president for greater freedom in setting rights and more liberal depreciation allowances from the IRS, Johnson got an agreement. This substantially boosted his self-confidence as well as his image.

That same year, Robert F. Kennedy was widely considered an impeccable choice to run as Johnson's vice presidential running mate but Johnson and Kennedy had never liked one another and Johnson, afraid that Kennedy would be credited with his election as president, abhorred the idea and opposed it at every turn. Kennedy was himself undecided about the position and, knowing that the prospect rankled Johnson, was content to eliminate himself from consideration. Ultimately, Goldwater's poor polling numbers degraded any dependence Johnson might have had on Kennedy as his running mate. Hubert Humphrey's selection as vice president then became a foregone conclusion and was thought to strengthen Johnson in the Midwest and industrial Northeast. Johnson, knowing full well the degree of frustration inherent in the office of vice president, put Humphrey through a gauntlet of interviews to guarantee his absolute loyalty and having made the decision, he kept the announcement from the press until the last moment to maximize media speculation and coverage.

In preparation for the Democratic convention, Johnson requested the FBI send a squad of thirty agents to cover convention activities; the objective of the squad was to inform the White House staff of any disruptive activities on the floor. The squad's focus narrowed upon the Mississippi Freedom Democratic Party (MFDP) delegation, which sought to displace the white segregationist delegation regularly selected in the state. The squad's activities also included wiretaps of Martin Luther King's room as well as the Student Nonviolent Coordinating Committee (SNCC) and the Congress of Racial Equality (CORE). From beginning to end, the squad's assignment was carefully couched in terms of the monitoring of disruptive activities that might endanger the president and other high-ranking officials.

Johnson was very concerned about potential political damage from media coverage of racial tensions exposed by a credentials fight between the MFDP and the segregationist delegation, and he assigned Humphrey the job of managing the problem. The convention's Credentials Committee declared that two MFDP delegates in the delegation be seated as observers and agreed to "bar future delegations from states where any citizens are deprived of the right to vote because of their race or color". The MFDP rejected the committee's ruling. The convention became the apparent personal triumph that Johnson craved, but a sense of betrayal caused by the marginalization of the MFDP would trigger disaffection with Johnson and the Democratic Party from the left; SNCC chairman John Lewis would call it a "turning point in the civil rights movement".

Early in the 1964 presidential campaign, Barry Goldwater appeared to be a strong contender, with strong support from the South, which threatened Johnson's position as he had predicted in reaction to the passage of the Civil Rights Act. However, Goldwater lost momentum as his campaign progressed. On September 7, 1964, Johnson's campaign managers broadcast the "Daisy ad". It portrayed a little girl picking petals from a daisy, counting up to ten. Then a baritone voice took over, counted down from ten to zero and the visual showed the explosion of a nuclear bomb. The message conveyed was that electing Goldwater president held the danger of a nuclear war. Goldwater's campaign message was best symbolized by the bumper sticker displayed by supporters claiming "In your heart, you know he's right". Opponents captured the spirit of Johnson's campaign with bumper stickers that said "In your heart, you know he might" and "In your guts, you know he's nuts". CIA Director William Colby asserted that Tracy Barnes instructed the CIA of the United States to spy on the Goldwater campaign and the Republican National Committee to provide information to Johnson's campaign. Johnson won the presidency by a landslide with 61.05 percent of the vote, making it the highest ever share of the popular vote. At the time, this was also the widest popular margin in the 20th century—more than 15.95 million votes—this was later surpassed by incumbent President Nixon's victory in 1972. In the Electoral College, Johnson defeated Goldwater by a margin of 486 to 52. Johnson won 44 states, compared to Goldwater's six. Voters also gave Johnson the largest majorities in Congress since FDR's election in 1936—a Senate with a 68–32 majority and a house with a 295–140 Democratic margin.

Voting Rights Act

Johnson began his elected presidential term with similar motives as he had upon succeeding to the office, ready to "carry forward the plans and programs of John Fitzgerald Kennedy. Not because of our sorrow or sympathy, but because they are right." He was reticent to push southern congressmen even further after passage of the Civil Rights Act of 1964 and suspected their support may have been temporarily tapped out. Nevertheless, the Selma to Montgomery marches in Alabama led by Martin Luther King ultimately led Johnson to initiate a debate on a voting rights bill in February 1965.

Johnson gave a congressional speech in which he said, "rarely at any time does an issue lay bare the secret heart of America itself [...] rarely are we met with the challenge [...] to the values and the purposes and the meaning of our beloved nation. The issue of equal rights for American Negroes is such an issue. And should we defeat every enemy, should we double our wealth and conquer the stars, and still be unequal to this issue, then we will have failed as a people and as a nation." In 1965, he achieved passage of a second civil rights bill called the Voting Rights Act which outlawed discrimination in voting, thus allowing millions of southern blacks to vote for the first time. Under the act, several states—"eight of the eleven southern states of the former confederacy" (Alabama, South Carolina, North Carolina, Tennessee, Georgia, Louisiana, Mississippi, Virginia)—were subjected to the procedure of preclearance in 1965, while Texas, then home to the largest African American population of any state, followed in 1975. The Senate passed the voting rights bill by a vote of 77–19 after 2 1/2 months, and it won passage in the house in July, 333–85. The results were significant: between the years of 1968 and 1980, the number of southern black elected state and federal officeholders nearly doubled. The act also made a large difference in the numbers of black elected officials nationally; a few hundred black office-holders in 1965 mushroomed to 6,000 in 1989.

After the murder of civil rights worker Viola Liuzzo, Johnson went on television to announce the arrest of four Ku Klux Klansmen implicated in her death. He angrily denounced the Klan as a "hooded society of bigots," and warned them to "return to a decent society before it's too late". Johnson was the first President to arrest and prosecute members of the Klan since Ulysses S. Grant about 93 years earlier. He turned to themes of Christian redemption to push for civil rights, thereby mobilizing support from churches North and South. At the Howard University commencement address on June 4, 1965, he said that both the government and the nation needed to help achieve these goals: "To shatter forever not only the barriers of law and public practice but the walls which bound the condition of many by the color of his skin. To dissolve, as best we can, the antique enmities of the heart which diminish the holder, divide the great democracy, and do wrong—great wrong—to the children of God ..."

In 1967, Johnson nominated civil rights attorney Thurgood Marshall to be the first African-American justice of the Supreme Court. To head the new Department of Housing and Urban Development, Johnson appointed Robert C. Weaver, the first African-American cabinet secretary in any U.S. presidential administration. In 1968, Johnson signed the Civil Rights Act of 1968, which provided for equal housing opportunities regardless of race, creed, or national origin. The impetus for the law's passage came from the 1966 Chicago Open Housing Movement, the April 4, 1968, assassination of Martin Luther King Jr., and the civil unrest across the country following King's death. On April 5, Johnson wrote a letter to the United States House of Representatives urging passage of the Fair Housing Act. With newly urgent attention from legislative director Joseph Califano and Democratic Speaker of the House John McCormack, the bill (which was previously stalled) passed the House by a wide margin on April 10.

Immigration

With the passage of the sweeping Immigration and Nationality Act of 1965, the country's immigration system was reformed and all national origins quotas dating from the 1920s were removed. The annual rate of inflow doubled between 1965 and 1970, and doubled again by 1990, with dramatic increases from Asia and Latin American countries including Mexico. Scholars give Johnson little credit for the law, which was not one of his priorities; he had supported the McCarren–Walter Act of 1952 that was unpopular with reformers.

Federal funding for education

Johnson, whose own ticket out of poverty was a public education in Texas, fervently believed that education was a cure for ignorance and poverty, and was an essential component of the American dream, especially for minorities who endured poor facilities and tight-fisted budgets from local taxes. He made education the top priority of the Great Society agenda, with an emphasis on helping poor children. After the 1964 landslide brought in many new liberal Congressmen, LBJ launched a legislative effort that took the name of the Elementary and Secondary Education Act (ESEA) of 1965. The bill sought to double federal spending on education from $4 billion to $8 billion; with considerable facilitating by the White House, it passed the House by a vote of 263 to 153 on March 26, and then it remarkably passed without a change in the Senate, by 73 to 8, without going through the usual conference committee. This was a historic accomplishment by the president, with the billion-dollar bill passing as introduced just 87 days before.

For the first time, large amounts of federal money went to public schools. In practice ESEA meant helping all public school districts, with more money going to districts that had large proportions of students from poor families (which included all the big cities). For the first time, private schools (most of them Catholic schools in the inner cities) received services, such as library funding, comprising about 12 percent of the ESEA budget. Though federal funds were involved, they were administered by local officials, and by 1977 it was reported that less than half of the funds were applied toward the education of children under the poverty line. Dallek further reports that researchers cited by Hugh Davis Graham soon found that poverty had more to do with family background and neighborhood conditions than the quantity of education a child received. Early studies suggested initial improvements for poor children helped by ESEA reading and math programs, but later assessments indicated that benefits faded quickly and left pupils little better off than those not in the schemes. Johnson's second major education program was the Higher Education Act of 1965, which focused on funding for lower-income students, including grants, work-study money, and government loans.

Although ESEA solidified Johnson's support among K-12 teachers' unions, neither the Higher Education Act nor the new endowments mollified the college professors and students growing increasingly uneasy with the war in Vietnam. In 1967, Johnson signed the Public Broadcasting Act to create educational television programs to supplement the broadcast networks.

In 1965, Johnson also set up the National Endowment for the Humanities and the National Endowment for the Arts, to support academic subjects such as literature, history, and law, and arts such as music, painting, and sculpture (as the WPA once did).

"War on Poverty" and healthcare reform

In 1964, at Johnson's request, Congress passed the Revenue Act of 1964 and the Economic Opportunity Act, as part of the war on poverty. Johnson set in motion legislation creating programs such as Head Start, food stamps and Work Study. During Johnson's years in office, national poverty declined significantly, with the percentage of Americans living below the poverty line dropping from 23 percent to 12 percent.

Johnson took an additional step in the War on Poverty with an urban renewal effort, presenting to Congress in January 1966 the "Demonstration Cities Program". To be eligible a city would need to demonstrate its readiness to "arrest blight and decay and make a substantial impact on the development of its entire city". Johnson requested an investment of $400 million per year totaling $2.4 billion. In the fall of 1966 the Congress passed a substantially reduced program costing $900 million, which Johnson later called the Model Cities Program. Changing the name had little effect on the success of the bill; the New York Times wrote 22 years later that the program was, for the most part, a failure.

Johnson's initial effort to improve healthcare was the creation of The Commission on Heart Disease, Cancer, and Strokes (HDCS). Combined, these diseases accounted for 71 percent of the nation's deaths in 1962. To enact recommendations of the commission, Johnson asked Congress for funds to set up the Regional Medical Program (RMP), to create a network of hospitals with federally funded research and practice; Congress passed a significantly watered-down version.

As a back-up position, in 1965 Johnson turned his focus to hospital insurance for the aged under Social Security. The key player in initiating this program, named Medicare, was Wilbur Mills, Chairman of the House Ways and Means Committee. To reduce Republican opposition, Mills suggested that Medicare be fashioned as a three-layer cake: hospital insurance under Social Security; a voluntary insurance program for doctor visits; and an expanded medical welfare program for the poor, known as Medicaid. The bill passed the house by a margin of 110 votes on April 8. The effort in the Senate was considerably more complicated; however, the Medicare bill passed Congress on July 28 after negotiation in a conference committee. Medicare now covers tens of millions of Americans. Johnson gave the first two Medicare cards to former President Harry S Truman and his wife Bess after signing the Medicare bill at the Truman Library in Independence, Missouri.

Transportation

In March 1965, Johnson sent to Congress a transportation message which included the creation of a new Transportation Department, which would include the Commerce Department's Office of Transportation, the Bureau of Public Roads, the Federal Aviation Agency, the Coast Guard, the Maritime Administration, the Civil Aeronautics Board, and the Interstate Commerce Commission. The bill passed the Senate after some negotiation over navigation projects; in the house, passage required negotiation over maritime interests and the bill was signed October 15, 1965.

Gun control
Though Johnson had already introduced a gun control bill on June 6, 1968, after the assassination of Robert Kennedy, Lady Bird Johnson's press secretary Liz Carpenter, in a memo to the president, worried that the country had been "brainwashed by high drama," and that Johnson "need[ed] some quick dramatic actions" that addressed "the issue of violence." In October, Johnson signed the Gun Control Act of 1968 into law, but did not invoke the memory of Robert Kennedy as he had so often done with his brother–an omission the historian Jeff Shesol has argued was motivated by Johnson's longstanding contempt for Robert.

Space program

During Johnson's administration, NASA conducted the Gemini manned space program, developed the Saturn V rocket and its launch facility, and prepared to make the first manned Apollo program flights. On January 27, 1967, the nation was stunned when the entire crew of Apollo 1 was killed in a cabin fire during a spacecraft test on the launch pad, stopping Apollo in its tracks. Rather than appointing another Warren-style commission, Johnson accepted Administrator James E. Webb's request for NASA to do its investigation, holding itself accountable to Congress and the President. Johnson maintained his staunch support of Apollo through Congressional and press controversy, and the program recovered. The first two manned missions, Apollo 7 and the first manned flight to the Moon, Apollo 8, were completed by the end of Johnson's term. He congratulated the Apollo 8 crew, saying, "You've taken ... all of us, all over the world, into a new era." On July 16, 1969, Johnson attended the launch of the first Moon landing mission Apollo 11, becoming the first former or incumbent U.S. president to witness a rocket launch.

Urban riots

Major riots in black neighborhoods caused a series of "long hot summers." They started with a violent disturbance in the Harlem riots in 1964, and the Watts district of Los Angeles in 1965, and extended to 1971. The momentum for the advancement of civil rights came to a sudden halt in the summer of 1965, with the riots in Watts. After 34 people were killed and $35 million (equivalent to $ million in ) in the property was damaged, the public feared an expansion of the violence to other cities, and so the appetite for additional programs in LBJ's agenda was lost.

Newark burned in 1967, where six days of rioting left 26 dead, 1,500 injured, and the inner city a burned-out shell. In Detroit in 1967, Governor George Romney sent in 7,400 national guard troops to quell fire bombings, looting, and attacks on businesses and police. Johnson finally sent in federal troops with tanks and machine guns. Detroit continued to burn for three more days until finally, 43 were dead, 2,250 were injured, 4,000 were arrested; property damage ranged into the hundreds of millions. The biggest wave of riots came in April 1968, in over a hundred cities after the assassination of Martin Luther King. Johnson called for even more billions to be spent in the cities and another federal civil rights law regarding housing, but this request had little Congressional support. Johnson's popularity plummeted as a massive white political backlash took shape, reinforcing the sense Johnson had lost control of the streets of major cities as well as his party. Johnson created the Kerner Commission to study the problem of urban riots, headed by Illinois Governor Otto Kerner. According to press secretary George Christian, Johnson was unsurprised by the riots, saying: "What did you expect? I don't know why we're so surprised. When you put your foot on a man's neck and hold him down for three hundred years, and then you let him up, what's he going to do? He's going to knock your block off."

As a result of rioting in Washington D.C. after the murder of Dr. Martin Luther King Jr.,  President Johnson determined that "a condition of domestic violence and disorder" existed and issued a proclamation and executive order mobilizing combat-equipped troops. The New York Times reported that 4,000 regular Army and National Guard troops entered into the nation's capital "to try to end riotous looting, burglarizing and burning by roving bands of Negro youths".  Some of the troops were sent to guard the Capital and the White House.

Backlash against Johnson (1966–1967)

In 1966, the press sensed a "credibility gap" between what Johnson was saying in press conferences and what was happening on the ground in Vietnam, which led to much less favorable coverage.

By year's end, the Democratic governor of Missouri, Warren E. Hearnes, warned that Johnson would lose the state by 100,000 votes, despite winning by a margin of 500,000 in 1964. "Frustration over Vietnam; too much federal spending and ... taxation; no great public support for your Great Society programs; and ... public disenchantment with the civil rights programs "had eroded the President's standing, the governor reported. There were bright spots; in January 1967, Johnson boasted that wages were the highest in history, unemployment was at a 13-year low, and corporate profits and farm incomes were greater than ever; a 4.5 percent jump in consumer prices was worrisome, as was the rise in interest rates. Johnson asked for a temporary 6 percent surcharge in income taxes to cover the mounting deficit caused by increased spending. Johnson's approval ratings stayed below 50 percent; by January 1967, the number of his strong supporters had plunged to 16 percent, from 25 percent four months before. He ran about even with Republican George Romney in trial matchups that spring. Asked to explain why he was unpopular, Johnson responded, "I am a dominating personality, and when I get things done I don't always please all the people." Johnson also blamed the press, saying they showed "complete irresponsibility and lie and misstate facts and have no one to be answerable to". He also blamed "the preachers, liberals and professors" who had turned against him.
In the congressional elections of 1966, the Republicans gained three seats in the Senate and 47 in the House, reinvigorating the conservative coalition and making it more difficult for Johnson to pass any additional Great Society legislation. However, in the end, Congress passed almost 96 percent of the administration's Great Society programs, which Johnson then signed into law.

Vietnam War

At Kennedy's death, there were 16,000 American military personnel stationed in Vietnam supporting South Vietnam in the war against North Vietnam. Vietnam had been partitioned at the 1954 Geneva Conference into two countries, with North Vietnam led by a Communist government. Johnson subscribed to the Domino Theory in Vietnam and to a containment policy that required America to make a serious effort to stop all Communist expansion. On taking office, Johnson immediately reversed Kennedy's order to withdraw 1,000 military personnel by the end of 1963. In late summer 1964, Johnson seriously questioned the value of staying in Vietnam but, after meeting with Secretary of State Dean Rusk and Chairman of the Joint Chiefs of Staff Maxwell D. Taylor, declared his readiness "to do more when we had a base" or when Saigon was politically more stable. He expanded the numbers and roles of the American military following the Gulf of Tonkin Incident.

1964

In August 1964, allegations arose from the military that two U.S. destroyers had been attacked by some North Vietnamese torpedo boats in international waters  from the Vietnamese coast in the Gulf of Tonkin; naval communications and reports of the attack were contradictory. Although Johnson very much wanted to keep discussions about Vietnam out of the 1964 election campaign, he felt forced to respond to the supposed aggression by the North Vietnamese, so he sought and obtained from the Congress the Gulf of Tonkin Resolution on August 7. Johnson was determined to embolden his image on foreign policy, and also wanted to prevent criticism such as Truman had received in Korea by proceeding without congressional endorsement of military action. Responding to the purported attack would also blunt presidential campaign criticism of weakness from the hawkish Goldwater camp. The resolution gave congressional approval for use of military force by the commander-in-chief to repel future attacks and also to assist members of SEATO requesting assistance. Johnson later in the campaign expressed assurance that the primary U.S. goal remained the preservation of South Vietnamese independence through material and advice, as opposed to any U.S. offensive posture. The public's reaction to the resolution at the time was positive—48 percent favored stronger measures in Vietnam and only 14 percent wanted to negotiate a settlement and leave.

In the 1964 presidential campaign, Johnson restated his determination to provide measured support for Vietnam while avoiding another Korea; but privately he had a sense of foreboding about Vietnam—a feeling that no matter what he did things would end badly. Indeed, his heart was on his Great Society agenda, and he even felt that his political opponents favored greater intervention in Vietnam to divert attention and resources away from his War on Poverty. The situation on the ground was aggravated in the fall by additional Viet Minh attacks on U.S. ships in the Tonkin Gulf, as well as an attack on Bien Hoa Air Base in South Vietnam. Johnson decided against retaliatory action at the time after consultation with the Joint Chiefs, and also after public pollster Lou Harris confirmed that his decision would not detrimentally affect him at the polls. By the end of 1964, there were approximately 23,000 military personnel in South Vietnam; U.S. casualties for 1964 totaled 1,278.

In the winter of 1964–1965, Johnson was pressured by the military to begin a bombing campaign to forcefully resist a communist takeover in South Vietnam; moreover, a plurality in the polls at the time was in favor of military action against the communists, with only 26 to 30 percent opposed. Johnson revised his priorities, and a new preference for stronger action came at the end of January with yet another change of government in Saigon. He then agreed with Mac Bundy and McNamara that the continued passive role would only lead to defeat and withdrawal in humiliation. Johnson said, "Stable government or no stable government in Saigon we will do what we ought to do. I'm prepared to do that; we will move strongly. General Nguyễn Khánh (head of the new government) is our boy".

1965

Johnson decided on a systematic bombing campaign in February after a ground report from Bundy recommending immediate U.S. action to avoid defeat; also, the Viet Cong had just killed eight U.S. advisers and wounded dozens of others in an attack at Pleiku Air Base. The eight-week bombing campaign became known as Operation Rolling Thunder. Johnson's instructions for public consumption were clear: there was to be no comment that the war effort had been expanded. Long-term estimates of the bombing campaign ranged from an expectation that Hanoi would rein in the Viet Cong to one of provoking Hanoi and the Viet Cong into an intensification of the war. But the short-term expectations were consistent that the morale and stability of the South Vietnamese government would be bolstered. By limiting the information given out to the public, and even to Congress, Johnson maximized his flexibility to change course.

In March, Bundy began to urge the use of ground forces—air operations alone, he counseled, would not stop Hanoi's aggression against the South. Johnson approved an increase in logistical troops of 18,000 to 20,000 and the deployment of two additional Marine battalions and a Marine air squadron, in addition to planning for the deployment of two more divisions. More significantly, he also authorized a change in mission from defensive to offensive operations; he nevertheless continued to insist that this was not to be publicly represented as a change in existing policy.

By the middle of June, the total U.S. ground forces in Vietnam had increased to 82,000 or by 150 percent. That same month, Ambassador Taylor reported that the bombing offensive against North Vietnam had been ineffective and that the South Vietnamese army was outclassed and in danger of collapse. General Westmoreland shortly thereafter recommended the president further increase ground troops from 82,000 to 175,000. After consulting with his principals, Johnson, desirous of a low profile, chose to announce at a press conference an increase to 125,000 troops, with additional forces to be sent later upon request. Johnson described himself at the time as boxed in by unpalatable choices—between sending Americans to die in Vietnam and giving in to the communists. If he sent additional troops he would be attacked as an interventionist and if he did not he thought he risked being impeached. He continued to insist that his decision "did not imply any change in policy whatsoever". Of his desire to veil the decision, Johnson jested privately, "If you have a mother-in-law with only one eye, and she has it in the center of her forehead, you don't keep her in the living room". By October 1965 there were over 200,000 troops deployed in Vietnam.

Johnson underwent surgery on November 8, 1965, at the Bethesda Naval Hospital to remove his gallbladder and a kidney stone. Afterward, his doctors reported that the president had come through the surgery "beautifully as expected"; he was able to resume his duties the next day. He met with reporters a couple of days later and reassured the nation that he was recovering well. Although Johnson was incapacitated during surgery, there was no transfer of presidential power to Vice President Humphrey, as no constitutional procedure to do so existed at the time. The Twenty-fifth Amendment, which Congress had sent to the states for ratification four months earlier, included procedures for the orderly transfer of power in the case of presidential incapacity, but was not ratified until 1967.

1966

Public and political impatience with the war began to emerge in the spring of 1966, and Johnson's approval ratings reached a new low of 41 percent. Sen. Richard Russell, Chairman of the Armed Services Committee, reflected the national mood in June 1966 when he declared it was time to "get it over or get out". Johnson responded by saying to the press, "we are trying to provide the maximum deterrence that we can to communist aggression with a minimum of cost." In response to the intensified criticism of the war effort, Johnson raised suspicions of communist subversion in the country, and press relations became strained. Johnson's primary war policy opponent in Congress was the chairman of the Foreign Relations Committee, James William Fulbright, who convened a series of public hearings in February to question a range of experts on the progress of the war. The persistent Johnson began to seriously consider a more focused bombing campaign against petroleum, oil and lubrication facilities in North Vietnam, in hopes of accelerating victory. Humphrey, Rusk, and McNamara all agreed, and the bombing began at the end of June. In July, polling results indicated that Americans favored the bombing campaign by a five-to-one margin; however, in August a Defense Department study indicated that the bombing campaign had little impact on North Vietnam.

In the fall of 1966, multiple sources began to report that progress was being made against the North Vietnamese logistics and infrastructure; Johnson was urged from every corner to begin peace discussions. There was no shortage of peace initiatives; nevertheless, among protesters, English philosopher Bertrand Russell attacked Johnson's policy as "a barbaric aggressive war of conquest", and in June he initiated the International War Crimes Tribunal as a means to condemn the American effort. The gap with Hanoi was an unbridgeable demand on both sides for a unilateral end to bombing and withdrawal of forces. In August, Johnson appointed Averell Harriman "Ambassador for Peace" to promote negotiations. Westmoreland and McNamara then recommended a concerted program to promote pacification; Johnson formally placed this effort under military control in October. Also in October 1966, to reassure and promote his war effort, Johnson initiated a meeting with allies in Manila—the South Vietnamese, Thais, South Koreans, Filipinos, Australians, and New Zealanders. The conference ended with pronouncements to stand fast against communist aggression and to promote ideals of democracy and development in Vietnam and across Asia. For Johnson it was a fleeting public relations success—confirmed by a 63 percent Vietnam approval rating in November. Nevertheless, in December, Johnson's Vietnam approval rating was again back down in the 40s; LBJ had become anxious to justify war casualties, and talked of the need for a decisive victory, despite the unpopularity of the cause. In a discussion about the war with former President Dwight Eisenhower on October 3, 1966, Johnson said he was "trying to win it just as fast as I can in every way that I know how" and later stated that he needed "all the help I can get".

By year's end, it was clear that current pacification efforts were ineffectual, as had been the air campaign. Johnson then agreed to McNamara's new recommendation to add 70,000 troops in 1967 to the 400,000 previously committed. While McNamara recommended no increase in the level of bombing, Johnson agreed with CIA recommendations to increase them. The increased bombing began despite initial secret talks being held in Saigon, Hanoi, and Warsaw. While the bombing ended the talks, North Vietnamese intentions were not considered genuine.

1967

In January and February 1967, probes were made to assess North Vietnamese's willingness to discuss peace, but they fell on deaf ears. Ho Chi Minh declared that the only solution was a unilateral withdrawal by the U.S. A Gallup poll taken in the United States in July 1967 showed that 52 percent of the country disapproved of the president's handling of the war, and only 34 percent thought progress was being made. Johnson's anger and frustration over the lack of a solution to Vietnam and its effect on him politically was exhibited in a statement to Robert F. Kennedy, who had become a prominent public critic of the war and loomed as a potential challenger in the 1968 presidential election. Johnson had just received several reports predicting military progress by the summer, and warned Kennedy, "I'll destroy you and every one of your dove friends in six months", he shouted. "You'll be dead politically in six months". McNamara offered Johnson a way out of Vietnam in May; the administration could declare its objective in the war—South Vietnam's self-determination—was being achieved and the upcoming September elections in South Vietnam would provide the chance for a coalition government. The United States could reasonably expect that country to then assume responsibility for the election outcome. But Johnson was reluctant, in light of some optimistic reports about the conflict that provided hope of improvement, though those were of questionable reliability. Meantime, the CIA was reporting wide food shortages in Hanoi and an unstable power grid, as well as military manpower reductions.

By the middle of 1967, nearly 70,000 Americans had been killed or wounded in the war. In July, Johnson sent McNamara, Wheeler, and other officials to meet with Westmoreland and reach an agreement on plans for the immediate future. At that time the war was being commonly described by the press and others as a "stalemate". Westmoreland said such a description was pure fiction, and that "we are winning slowly but steadily and the pace can excel if we reinforce our successes". Though Westmoreland sought many more, Johnson agreed to an increase of 55,000 troops bringing the total to 525,000. In August Johnson, with the Joint Chiefs' support, decided to expand the air campaign and exempted only Hanoi, Haiphong and a buffer zone with China from the target list. In September Ho Chi Minh and North Vietnamese premier, Pham Van Dong appeared amenable to French mediation, so Johnson ceased bombing in a 10-mile zone around Hanoi; this was met with dissatisfaction [from whom?]. In a Texas speech, Johnson agreed to halt all bombing if Ho Chi Minh would launch productive and meaningful discussions and if North Vietnam would not seek to take advantage of the halt; this was named the "San Antonio" formula. There was no response, but Johnson pursued the possibility of negotiations with such a bombing pause.

With the war still arguably in a stalemate and in light of the widespread disapproval of the conflict, Johnson convened a group called the "Wise Men" for a fresh, in-depth look at the war—Dean Acheson, General Omar Bradley, George Ball, Mac Bundy, Arthur Dean, Douglas Dillon, Abe Fortas, Averell Harriman, Henry Cabot Lodge, Robert Murphy and Max Taylor. At that time McNamara, reversing his position on the war, recommended that a cap of 525,000 be placed on the number of forces deployed and that the bombing be halted since he could see no success. Johnson was quite agitated by this recommendation and McNamara's resignation soon followed. Except for George Ball, the "Wise Men" all agreed the administration should "press forward". Johnson was confident that Hanoi would await the 1968 U.S. election results before deciding to negotiate.

On June 23, 1967, Johnson traveled to Los Angeles for a Democratic fundraiser. Thousands of anti-war protesters tried to march past the hotel where he was speaking. The march was led by a coalition of peace protestors. However, a small group of Progressive Labor Party and SDS protestors activists placed themselves at the head of the march and, when they reached the hotel, staged a sit-down. Efforts by march monitors to keep the main body of the marchers moving were only partially successful. Hundreds of LAPD officers were massed at the hotel and when the march slowed an order was given to disperse the crowd. The Riot Act was read and 51 protestors arrested. This was one of the first massive war protests in the United States, and the first in Los Angeles. Ending in a clash with riot police, it set a pattern for the massive protests which followed. Due to the size and violence of this event, Johnson attempted no further public speeches in venues outside military bases.

In October, with the ever-increasing public protests against the war, Johnson engaged the FBI and the CIA to investigate, monitor and undermine anti-war activists. In mid-October, there was a demonstration of 100,000 at the Pentagon; Johnson and Rusk were convinced that foreign communist sources were behind the demonstration, which was refuted by CIA findings.

1968

On January 30, the Viet Cong and North Vietnamese launched the Tet Offensive against South Vietnam's five largest cities, including Saigon and the U.S. embassy there and other government installations. While the Tet Offensive failed militarily, it was a psychological victory, definitively turning American public opinion against the war effort. Iconically, Walter Cronkite of CBS News, voted the nation's "most trusted person" in February, opined on the air that the conflict was deadlocked and that additional fighting would change nothing. Johnson reacted, saying "If I've lost Cronkite, I've lost middle America". Indeed, demoralization about the war was everywhere; 26 percent then approved of Johnson's handling of Vietnam; 63 percent disapproved. Johnson agreed to increase the troop level by 22,000, despite a recommendation from the Joint Chiefs for ten times that number. By March 1968, Johnson was secretly desperate for an honorable way out of the war. Clark Clifford, the new Defense Secretary, described the war as "a loser" and proposed to "cut losses and get out". On March 31, Johnson spoke to the nation of "Steps to Limit the War in Vietnam". He then announced an immediate unilateral halt to the bombing of North Vietnam and announced his intention to seek out peace talks anywhere at any time. At the close of his speech he also announced, "I shall not seek, and I will not accept, the nomination of my party for another term as your President".

In March, Johnson decided to restrict future bombing with the result that 75 percent of North Vietnam's territory, containing 90 percent of its population, was off-limits to bombing. In April he succeeded in opening discussions of peace talks, and after extensive negotiations over the site, Paris was agreed to and talks began in May. When the talks failed to yield any results the decision was made to resort to private discussions in Paris. Two months later it was apparent that private discussions proved to be no more productive.

As casualties mounted and success seemed further away than ever, Johnson's popularity plummeted. College students and others protested, burned draft cards, and chanted, "Hey, hey, LBJ, how many kids did you kill today?" Johnson could scarcely travel anywhere without facing protests, and was not allowed by the Secret Service to attend the 1968 Democratic National Convention, where thousands of hippies, yippies, Black Panthers and other opponents of Johnson's policies both in Vietnam and in the ghettos converged to protest. Thus by 1968, the public was polarized, with the "hawks" rejecting Johnson's refusal to continue the war indefinitely, and the "doves" rejecting his current war policies. Support for Johnson's middle position continued to shrink until he finally rejected containment and sought a peace settlement. By late summer, he realized that Nixon was closer to his position than Humphrey. He continued to support Humphrey publicly in the election, and personally despised Nixon. One of Johnson's well-known quotes was "the Democratic party at its worst, is still better than the Republican party at its best".

Despite recommendations in August from Harriman, Vance, Clifford, and Bundy to halt bombing as an incentive for Hanoi to seriously engage in substantive peace talks, Johnson refused. In October, when the parties came close to an agreement on a bombing halt, Republican presidential nominee Richard Nixon intervened with the South Vietnamese, making promises of better terms, to delay a settlement on the issue until after the election. After the election, Johnson's primary focus on Vietnam was to get Saigon to join the Paris peace talks. Ironically, only after Nixon added his urging did they do so. Even then they argued about procedural matters until after Nixon took office.

The Six-Day War and Israel

In a 1993 interview for the Johnson Presidential Library oral history archives, Johnson's Secretary of Defense Robert McNamara stated that a carrier battle group, the U.S. 6th Fleet, sent on a training exercise toward Gibraltar, was re-positioned back towards the eastern Mediterranean to be able to assist Israel during the Six-Day War of June 1967. Given the rapid Israeli advances following their strike on Egypt, the administration "thought the situation was so tense in Israel that perhaps the Syrians, fearing Israel would attack them, or the Soviets supporting the Syrians might wish to redress the balance of power and might attack Israel". The Soviets learned of this course correction and regarded it as an offensive move. In a hotline message from Moscow, Soviet Premier Alexei Kosygin said, "If you want war you're going to get war."

The Soviet Union supported its Arab allies. In May 1967, the Soviets started a surge deployment of their naval forces into the East Mediterranean. Early in the crisis they began to shadow the U.S. and British carriers with destroyers and intelligence collecting vessels. The Soviet naval squadron in the Mediterranean was sufficiently strong to act as a major restraint on the U.S. Navy. In a 1983 interview with The Boston Globe, McNamara claimed that "We damn near had war". He said Kosygin was angry that "we had turned around a carrier in the Mediterranean".

Surveillance of Martin Luther King
Johnson continued the FBI's wiretapping of Martin Luther King Jr. that had been previously authorized by the Kennedy administration under Attorney General Robert F. Kennedy. As a result of listening to the FBI's tapes, remarks on King's extra-marital activities were made by several prominent officials, including Johnson, who once said that King was a "hypocritical preacher". This was despite the fact that Johnson himself had multiple extramarital affairs. Johnson also authorized the tapping of phone conversations of others, including the Vietnamese friends of a Nixon associate.

International trips

Johnson made eleven international trips to twenty countries during his presidency. He flew  aboard Air Force One while in office. His October 1966 visit to Australia sparked demonstrations from anti-war protesters. One of the most unusual international trips in presidential history occurred before Christmas in 1967. The President began the trip by going to the memorial service for Australian Prime Minister Harold Holt, who had disappeared in a swimming accident and was presumed drowned. The White House did not reveal in advance to the press that the President would make the first round-the-world presidential trip. The trip was  completed in only 112.5 hours (4.7 days). Air Force One crossed the equator twice, stopped at Travis Air Force Base, in Honolulu, Pago Pago, Canberra, Melbourne, Vietnam, Karachi, and Rome.

1968 presidential election

As he had served less than 24 months of President Kennedy's term, Johnson was constitutionally permitted to run for a second full term in the 1968 presidential election under the provisions of the 22nd Amendment.
Initially, no prominent Democratic candidate was prepared to run against a sitting president of the Democratic Party. Only Senator Eugene McCarthy of Minnesota challenged Johnson as an anti-war candidate in the New Hampshire primary, hoping to pressure the Democrats to oppose the Vietnam War. On March 12, McCarthy won 42 percent of the primary vote to Johnson's 49 percent, an amazingly strong showing for such a challenger. Four days later, Senator Robert F. Kennedy of New York entered the race. Internal polling by Johnson's campaign in Wisconsin, the next state to hold a primary election, showed the President trailing badly. Johnson did not leave the White House to campaign.

By this time Johnson had lost control of the Democratic Party, which was splitting into four generally antagonistic factions. The first consisted of Johnson (and Humphrey), labor unions, and local party bosses led by Chicago Mayor Richard J. Daley. The second group consisted of students and intellectuals who were vociferously against the war and rallied behind McCarthy. The third group was Catholics, Hispanics, and African Americans, who rallied behind Robert Kennedy. The fourth group was traditionally segregationist white Southerners, who rallied behind George C. Wallace and the American Independent Party. Vietnam was one of many issues that splintered the party, and Johnson could see no way to win the war and no way to unite the party long enough for him to win re-election.

Also, although it was not made public at the time, Johnson had become more worried about his failing health and was concerned that he might not live through another four-year term. In 1967, he secretly commissioned an actuarial study that accurately predicted he would die at 64.

In early January 1968, Johnson asked former speechwriter Horace Busby to draft a withdrawal statement that he could put into his upcoming State of the Union address, but the president did not include it. Two months later, however, spurred by his health concerns and by a growing realization that his political capital was all but gone, Johnson again considered withdrawing; discussing the possibility with Joseph Califano and Harry McPherson on March 28. Three days later, he shocked the nation when he announced he would not run for re-election by concluding with the line: "I shall not seek, and I will not accept, the nomination of my party for another term as your President." The next day, the president's approval ratings increased from 36 percent to 49 percent.

Historians have debated the factors that led to Johnson's surprise decision. Shesol says Johnson wanted out of the White House but also wanted vindication; when the indicators turned negative he decided to leave.  Gould says that Johnson had neglected the party, was hurting it by his Vietnam policies and underestimated McCarthy's strength until the last minute, when it was too late for Johnson to recover. Woods says Johnson realized he needed to leave for the nation to heal. Dallek says that Johnson had no further domestic goals, and realized that his personality had eroded his popularity. His health was not good, and he was preoccupied with the Kennedy campaign; his wife was pressing for his retirement and his base of support continued to shrink. Leaving the race would allow him to pose as a peacemaker. Bennett, however, says Johnson "had been forced out of a reelection race in 1968 by outrage over his policy in Southeast Asia".

After Robert Kennedy's assassination, Johnson rallied the party bosses and unions to give Humphrey the nomination at the 1968 Democratic National Convention. Personal correspondences between the President and some in the Republican Party suggested Johnson tacitly supported Nelson Rockefeller's campaign. He reportedly said that if Rockefeller became the Republican nominee, he would not campaign against him (and would not campaign for Humphrey). In what was termed the October surprise, Johnson announced to the nation on October 31, 1968, that he had ordered a complete cessation of "all air, naval and artillery bombardment of North Vietnam", effective November 1, should the Hanoi Government be willing to negotiate and citing progress with the Paris peace talks. In the end, Democrats did not fully unite behind Humphrey, enabling Republican candidate Richard Nixon to win the election.

Judicial appointments

Johnson appointed Justices Abe Fortas (1965) and Thurgood Marshall (1967) to the Supreme Court of the United States. Johnson anticipated court challenges to his legislative measures in 1965 and thought it advantageous to have a "mole" in the Supreme Court who he thought could provide him with inside information, as he was able to get from the legislative branch. Abe Fortas in particular was the individual that Johnson thought could fill the bill. The opportunity arose when an opening occurred for ambassador to the UN, with Adlai Stevenson's death; Associate Justice Arthur Goldberg accepted Johnson's offer to transfer to the UN position. Johnson insisted on Fortas assuming Goldberg's seat, over Fortas's wife's objection that it was too early in his career. She expressed disapproval to Johnson personally afterward. When Earl Warren announced his retirement in 1968, Johnson nominated Fortas to succeed him as Chief Justice of the United States, and nominated Homer Thornberry to succeed Fortas as associate justice. However, Fortas's nomination was filibustered by senators, and neither nominee was voted upon by the full Senate.

Post-presidency (1969–1973)

After leaving the presidency in January 1969, Johnson went home to his ranch in Stonewall, Texas, accompanied by a former aide and speechwriter Harry J. Middleton, who would draft Johnson's first book, The Choices We Face, and work with him on his memoirs entitled The Vantage Point: Perspectives of the Presidency 1963–1969, published in 1971. That year, the Lyndon Baines Johnson Library and Museum opened on the campus of The University of Texas at Austin. He donated his Texas ranch in his will to the public to form the Lyndon B. Johnson National Historical Park, with the provision that the ranch "remain a working ranch and not become a sterile relic of the past".

Johnson gave Nixon high grades in foreign policy but worried that his successor was being pressured into removing U.S. forces too quickly from South Vietnam before the South Vietnamese were able to defend themselves. "If the South falls to the Communists, we can have a serious backlash here at home," he warned.

During the 1972 presidential election, Johnson reluctantly endorsed Democratic presidential nominee George McGovern, a senator from South Dakota; McGovern had long opposed Johnson's foreign and defense policies. The McGovern nomination and presidential platform dismayed him. Nixon could be defeated, Johnson insisted, "if only the Democrats don't go too far left". Johnson had felt Edmund Muskie would be more likely to defeat Nixon; however, he declined an invitation to try to stop McGovern receiving the nomination as he felt his unpopularity within the Democratic Party was such that anything he said was more likely to help McGovern. Johnson's protégé John Connally had served as President Nixon's Secretary of the Treasury and then stepped down to head "Democrats for Nixon", a group funded by Republicans. It was the first time that Connally and Johnson were on opposite sides of a general election campaign.

Heart issues 

In March 1970, Johnson suffered an attack of angina and was taken to Brooke Army General Hospital in San Antonio. He had also resumed smoking after abstaining for nearly 15 years. The following summer, again gripped by chest pains, he lost  in less than a month on a crash diet.

In April 1972, Johnson had a second heart attack while visiting his daughter, Lynda, in Virginia. "I'm hurting real bad", he confided to friends. The chest pains returned nearly every afternoona series of sharp, jolting pains that left him frightened and breathless. A portable oxygen tank was kept by his bed, and he periodically interrupted what he was doing to lie down and don the mask. He continued to smoke heavily and, although nominally living on a low-calorie, low-cholesterol diet, kept to it only intermittently. Meanwhile, he began to experience severe abdominal pains, diagnosed as diverticulosis. His heart condition rapidly worsened and surgery was recommended, so Johnson flew to Houston to consult with heart specialist Dr. Michael DeBakey, where he learned his condition was terminal. DeBakey found Johnson's heart to be in such poor condition that although two of his coronary arteries required coronary bypass surgery, the former president was not well enough to consider an attempt and would likely have died in surgery.

Death and funeral

Johnson recorded an hour-long television interview with newsman Walter Cronkite at his ranch on January 12, 1973, in which he discussed his legacy, particularly about the civil rights movement. He was still smoking heavily at the time, and told Cronkite that it was better for his heart "to smoke than to be nervous".

Ten days later, at approximately 3:39 p.m. Central Time on January 22, 1973, Johnson suffered his third and final, fatal heart attack in his bedroom. He managed to telephone the Secret Service agents on the ranch, who found him still holding the telephone receiver, unconscious and not breathing. Johnson was airlifted in one of his planes to San Antonio and taken to Brooke Army Medical Center, where cardiologist and Army colonel George McGranahan pronounced him dead on arrival. He was 64 years old.

The news of Johnson's death was dramatically communicated on CBS Evening News by Walter Cronkite, on live television, as he spoke with Tom Johnson, Lyndon B. Johnson's press secretary.

State funeral

After lying in state in the Rotunda of the U.S. Capitol, Johnson was honored with a state funeral in which Texas Congressman J. J. Pickle and former Secretary of State Dean Rusk eulogized him at the Capitol. The final services took place on January 25. The funeral was held at the National City Christian Church in Washington, D.C., where he had often worshiped as president. The service was presided over by President Richard Nixon and attended by foreign dignitaries, led by Eisaku Satō, who had served as Japanese prime minister during Johnson's presidency. Eulogies were given by George Davis, the church's pastor, and W. Marvin Watson, former postmaster general. Nixon did not speak, though he attended, as is customary for presidents during state funerals, but the eulogists turned to him and lauded him for his tributes, as Rusk did the day before, as Nixon mentioned Johnson's death in a speech he gave the day after Johnson died, announcing the peace agreement to end the Vietnam War.

Johnson was buried in his family's private cemetery a few yards from the house in which he was born. Eulogies were given by former Texas governor Connally and the Reverend Billy Graham, the minister who officiated at the burial rites. The state funeral, the last for a president until Richard Nixon's in 1994, was part of an unexpectedly busy week in Washington, as the Military District of Washington (MDW) dealt with its second major task in less than a week, beginning with Richard Nixon's second inauguration, which followed Nixon's landslide victory in the 1972 election. The inauguration affected the state funeral in various ways, because Johnson died only two days after the inauguration. The MDW and the Armed Forces Inaugural Committee canceled the remainder of the ceremonies surrounding the inauguration, to allow for a full state funeral, and many of the military men who participated in the inauguration took part in the funeral. It also meant that Johnson's casket traveled the entire length of the Capitol, entering through the Senate wing when taken into the rotunda to lie in state and exiting through the House wing steps due to inauguration construction on the East Front steps.

Personality and public image

According to biographer Randall Woods, Johnson posed in many different roles. Depending on the circumstances, he could be:

Other historians have noted how he played additional roles, as Kent Germany reports:

Johnson was often seen as a wildly ambitious, tireless, and imposing figure who was ruthlessly effective at getting legislation passed. He worked 18- to 20-hour days without break and was absent of any leisure activities. "There was no more powerful majority leader in American history," biographer Robert Dallek writes. Dallek stated that Johnson had biographies on all the senators, knew what their ambitions, hopes, and tastes were and used it to his advantage in securing votes. Another Johnson biographer noted, "He could get up every day and learn what their fears, their desires, their wishes, their wants were and he could then manipulate, dominate, persuade and cajole them." As president, Johnson vetoed 30 bills; no other president in history vetoed so many bills and never had a single one overridden by Congress. A contemporary writes, "It was an incredible blend of badgering, cajolery, reminders of past favors, promises of future favors, predictions of gloom if something doesn't happen. When that man started to work on you, all of a sudden, you just felt that you were standing under a waterfall and the stuff was pouring on you."

Johnson's cowboy hat and boots reflected his Texas roots and genuine love of the rural hill country. From  of land that he was given by an aunt in 1951, he created a  working ranch with 400 head of registered Hereford cattle. The National Park Service keeps a herd of Hereford cattle descended from Johnson's registered herd and maintains the ranch property.

Biographer Randall Woods argues that Social Gospel themes Johnson learned from childhood allowed him to transform social problems into moral problems. This helps explain his longtime commitment to social justice, as exemplified by the Great Society and his commitment to racial equality. The Social Gospel explicitly inspired his foreign-policy approach to a sort of Christian internationalism and nation-building. For example, in a 1966 speech he quoted at length from the Social Creed of the Methodist Church issued in 1940, adding "It would be very hard for me to write a more perfect description of the American ideal."

Legacy

Historian Kent Germany explains Johnson's poor public image:The man who was elected to the White House by one of the widest margins in U.S. history and pushed through as much legislation as any other American politician now seems to be remembered best by the public for succeeding an assassinated hero, steering the country into a quagmire in Vietnam, cheating on his saintly wife, exposing his stitched-up belly, using profanity, picking up dogs by their ears, swimming naked with advisers in the White House pool, and emptying his bowels while conducting official business. Of all those issues, Johnson's reputation suffers the most from his management of the Vietnam War, something that has overshadowed his civil rights and domestic policy accomplishments and caused Johnson himself to regret his handling of "the woman I really loved—the Great Society."

Scholars, on the other hand, have viewed Johnson both through the lens of his historic legislative achievements, and his lack of success in the Vietnam War. His overall rating among historians has remained relatively steady over the past 35 years, and his average ranking is higher than any of the eight presidents who followed him, although similar to Reagan and Clinton.

The Manned Spacecraft Center in Houston was renamed the Lyndon B. Johnson Space Center in 1973. Texas created a legal state holiday to be observed on August 27 to mark Johnson's birthday, known as Lyndon Baines Johnson Day. The Lyndon Baines Johnson Memorial Grove on the Potomac was dedicated on April 6, 1976.

The Lyndon B. Johnson School of Public Affairs at the University of Texas at Austin was named in his honor, as is the Lyndon B. Johnson National Grassland. Also named for him are Lyndon B. Johnson High School in Austin, Texas; Lyndon B. Johnson High School in Laredo, Texas; Lyndon B. Johnson Middle School in Melbourne, Florida; and Lyndon B. Johnson Elementary School in Jackson, Kentucky. Interstate 635 in Dallas, Texas, is named the Lyndon B. Johnson Freeway.

Johnson was awarded the Presidential Medal of Freedom posthumously in 1980.

On March 23, 2007, President George W. Bush signed legislation naming the United States Department of Education headquarters after President Johnson.

Major legislation signed
 1963: Clean Air Act of 1963
 1963: Higher Education Facilities Act of 1963
 1963: Vocational Education Act of 1963
 1964: Civil Rights Act of 1964
 1964: Urban Mass Transportation Act of 1964
 1964: Wilderness Act
 1964: Nurse Training Act of 1964
 1964: Food Stamp Act of 1964
 1964: Economic Opportunity Act
 1964: Housing Act of 1964
 1965: Higher Education Act of 1965
 1965: Older Americans Act
 1965: Coinage Act of 1965
 1965: Social Security Act of 1965
 1965: Voting Rights Act of 1965
 1965: Immigration and Nationality Services Act of 1965
 1966: Animal Welfare Act of 1966
 1966: Freedom of Information Act (FOIA)
 1967: Age Discrimination in Employment Act
 1967: Public Broadcasting Act of 1967
 1968: Architectural Barriers Act of 1968
 1968: Bilingual Education Act
 1968: Civil Rights Act of 1968
 1968: Gun Control Act of 1968

Significant regulatory changes
 1968: FCC creates national emergency number 9-1-1

Works
 National Aeronautics and Space Act (1962)
 Choices We Face (1969)
 The Vantage Point (1971)

See also

 Box 13 scandal
 Family of Lyndon B. Johnson 
 Electoral history of Lyndon B. Johnson
 History of the United States (1945–1964)
 History of the United States (1964–1980)
 Holocaust Museum Houston
 Johnson Doctrine
 List of presidents of the United States
 List of presidents of the United States by previous experience
 Lyndon B. Johnson School of Public Affairs
 Lyndon Baines Johnson Library and Museum on the campus of the University of Texas in Austin
 Lyndon B. Johnson in popular culture
 Presidents of the United States on U.S. postage stamps
 Zephyr Wright

Notes

References

Works cited

Further reading

 
 Berman, Larry. Lyndon Johnson's War: The Road to Stalemate in Vietnam (1991)
 
 
 Cohen, Warren I., and Nancy Bernkopf Tuckerm, eds. Lyndon Johnson Confronts the World: American Foreign Policy 1963–1968 (Cambridge University Press, 1994).
 
 , abridged version of his two-volume biography
 
 Gavin, Francis J. and Mark Atwood Lawrence, eds. (2014) Beyond the Cold War: Lyndon Johnson and the New Global Challenges of the 1960s  online
 Lichtenstein, Nelson, ed. Political Profiles: The Johnson Years. 1976. short biographies of 400+ key politicians
 
 
 Vandiver, Frank E. Shadows of Vietnam: Lyndon Johnson's Wars (1997)
 Woods, Randall B. Prisoners of Hope: Lyndon B. Johnson, the Great Society, and the Limits of Liberalism (2016), 480pp.
 Zarefsky, David. President Johnson's War on Poverty (1986).

Historiography
 Catsam, Derek. "The Civil Rights Movement and the Presidency in the Hot Years of the Cold War: A Historical and Historiographical Assessment". History Compass 6#1 (2008): 314–344.
 Germany, Kent B. "Historians and the Many Lyndon Johnsons: A Review Essay". Journal of Southern History (2009) 75#4 pp. 1001–1028. in JSTOR
 Lerner, Mitchell B. A Companion to Lyndon B. Johnson (2012); scholarly essays on all aspects of Johnson's career.

External links

 Presidential Library & Museum
 White House biography
 The Presidential Recordings of Lyndon B. Johnson Digital Edition 
 
 "Life Portrait of Lyndon B. Johnson", from C-SPAN's American Presidents: Life Portraits, November 12, 1999
 
 
 
 Lyndon Baines Johnson: A Resource Guide from the Library of Congress
 Extensive essays on Lyndon Johnson and shorter essays on each member of his cabinet and First Lady from the Miller Center of Public Affairs
 LBJ , an American Experience documentary
 Lyndon B. Johnson Personal Manuscripts
 

 
1908 births
1973 deaths
20th-century vice presidents of the United States
20th-century Disciples of Christ
20th-century presidents of the United States
20th-century American memoirists
United States Navy personnel of World War II
American people of English descent
American people of German descent
American people of Scotch-Irish descent
American people of Scottish descent
American people of the Vietnam War
Civil rights movement
Schoolteachers from Texas
Articles containing video clips
Burials in Texas
Democratic Party (United States) presidential nominees
American anti-communists
Democratic Party (United States) vice presidential nominees
Democratic Party members of the United States House of Representatives from Texas
Democratic Party presidents of the United States
Democratic Party United States senators from Texas
Democratic Party vice presidents of the United States
American Freemasons
1960s in the United States
Kennedy administration cabinet members
Lyndon
Military personnel from Texas
People associated with the assassination of John F. Kennedy
Politicians from Austin, Texas
People from Fredericksburg, Texas
People from Gillespie County, Texas
People from the Texas Hill Country
Presidential Medal of Freedom recipients
Presidents of the United States
Ranchers from Texas
Recipients of the Silver Star
San Marcos, Texas
Sons of the American Revolution
Space advocates
Texas State University alumni
Time Person of the Year
Candidates in the 1956 United States presidential election
Candidates in the 1960 United States presidential election
Candidates in the 1964 United States presidential election
1960 United States vice-presidential candidates
Vice presidents of the United States
Writers from Austin, Texas
20th-century American educators
People of the Cold War
United States Navy officers
United States Navy reservists
Liberalism in the United States